Nizhnegnutov is a rural locality (a khutor) and the administrative center of Nizhnegnutovskoye Rural Settlement, Chernyshkovsky District, Volgograd Oblast, Russia. The population was 1,054 as of 2010. There are 17 streets.

Geography 
Nizhnegnutov is located on the bank of the Tsimlyansk Reservoir, 50 km south of Chernyshkovsky (the district's administrative centre) by road. Loznoy is the nearest rural locality.

References 

Rural localities in Chernyshkovsky District